North American Neuromodulation Society is a scientific organization that serves to promote and advance neuromodulation as a treatment for various diseases.

History
NANS was founded in 1994 as the American Neuromodulation Society.  It was renamed the North American Neuromodulation Society in 1999.

American Neuromodulation Society
The American Neuromodulation Society was the brain-child of Ballard Wright, MD and Barry N. Strauss, MD.  Dr. Wright was largely responsible for incorporating and establishing ANS as a non-profit organization in the United States.  In the early days, with Dr. Wright volunteering to be the initial Executive Director, the society offices operated through his offices in Lexington, Kentucky. The organization briefly changed its acronym to ANmS to avoid confusion because a company previously named Neuromed adopted the ANS acronym.

Today
Now based in Chicago, NANS developed out of the American Neuromodulation Society and has evolved into a national organization whose membership has grown to more than 800 members, signifying growing interest in this specialty. The majority of these members are working in pain-related disciplines, although members in areas such as epilepsy, urinary incontinence, angina, and movement disorders are also represented. Medical specialties represented in the membership include anesthesiology, neurosurgery, neurology, PM&R, gastroenterology, urology and basic science. In addition, NANS has taken active part in opening forums for presenting the work of those who deal with functional electrical stimulation for patients with tetraplegia (quadriplegia) and paraplegia or paralysis due to brain injury and stroke. Approximately 800-1000 participants attended the annual scientific meeting at the Wynn Las Vegas.

The official journal of NANS' parent organization the International Neuromodulation Society and its chapters is Neuromodulation: Technology at the Neural Interface. Published eight times per year, the journal is MEDLINE-indexed.

Presidents
 1994–1998: Michael Stanton-Hicks
 1998–2001: John C. Oakley
 2001–2002: Sam Hassenbusch
 2002–2003: Peter Staats
 2003–2005: Richard B. North
 2005–2007: Joshua Prager  
 2007–2009: Jaimie Henderson
 2009–2011: Robert Foreman
 2011–2013: Dr. Ali Rezai
 2013–2015: David Kloth
 2015–2017: Ashwini Sharan
 2017–Present: Todd Sitzman

Relationship with International Neuromodulation Society
International Neuromodulation Society (INS) was founded in 1992, to sensitize the international medical community to the concept of neuromodulation as an emerging multidisciplinary field. The American Neuromodulation Society independently formed in 1994 and later joined the International Neuromodulation Society as its North American Chapter.

References

Neurology organizations
Medical and health organizations based in Kentucky